The Tupolev Tu-75 was a military transport variant of the Tu-4 bomber, an unlicensed, reverse engineered copy of the Boeing B-29 Superfortress. The Tu-75 was similar to the Tu-70 airliner, both using a new, purpose-designed fuselage. The first Soviet military machine of this class, it was equipped with a rear fuselage loading ramp. It was not placed into production because the VVS decided it would be cheaper to modify its existing Tu-4s for the transport mission and to use its existing Lisunov Li-2 and Ilyushin Il-12 transports.

Design and development
The Tupolev OKB began work in September 1946 on a military transport version of the Tupolev Tu-70 airliner and this was confirmed by the Council of Ministers on 11 March 1947 with state trials to begin in August 1948. To expedite the process, maximum use was made of components of the Tu-70. Its engines were the uprated Shvetsov ASh-73TKFN or TKNV fuel-injected version. A new, narrower fuselage was designed, which included a rear cargo hatch, a vehicle loading ramp and paratroop exit doors. Three gun turrets (dorsal, ventral and tail), were to be adapted from the Tu-4, although they were not fitted on the prototype. It had a crew of six (two pilots, three gunners, a radio operator, and a navigator).

The aircraft was intended for three different roles; transport, parachute transport and aerial ambulance. It could carry either 120 troops, 96 fully loaded paratroopers or 64 standard parachute loads. As an aerial ambulance it could carry 31 stretchers and four medical attendants.

Operational history
Construction of the first prototype was quite prolonged; the aircraft was not finished until November 1949, with its first flight taking place on 21 January 1950. It finished its manufacturer's trials the following May, but Tupolev decided not to submit it for the State acceptance trials as the Soviet Air Force had already decided that it would be cheaper to rely on its existing transports and to modify Tu-4 bombers for the cargo role. The prototype was used by the MAP ( – Ministry of Aviation Industry) until it crashed in October 1954.

Specifications

See also

References

Notes

Bibliography
 
 
 

Tu-0075
1950s Soviet military transport aircraft
Four-engined tractor aircraft
Low-wing aircraft
Abandoned military aircraft projects of the Soviet Union
Tu-75
Aircraft first flown in 1950
Four-engined piston aircraft